Brasilosuchus is an extinct monospecific genus of crocodilian that lived during the Miocene of Brazil. It contains one species, Brasilosuchus mendesi, named by Jonas Souza-Filho and Jean Bocquetin-Villanueva in 1989. They subsequently re-identified it as a species of Charactosuchus in a 1993 conference abstract, but this conclusion has not been accepted since it was not published. Along with Charactosuchus, it is possibly a member of Tomistominae, but they have not been included in a phylogenetic analysis. If this interpretation is correct, then they would have originated from North American ancestors in the first dispersal of the group into the Americas.

References

Crocodilians
Gavialidae
Miocene crocodylomorphs
Neogene reptiles of South America